Cała prawda o planecie Ksi (1983) (The Complete Truth about Planet Xi) is a social science fiction novel by Polish writer Janusz A. Zajdel about the first  colony of the Earth beyond the Solar System, whose hibernated settlers were taken over by terrorists during the flight. The colony is visited by the inspectors arriving in secret to discover why they do not answer any messages from the Earth. The novel covers the problems of political systems, terrorism and the manipulation of power, and includes multiple allusions at People's Republic of Poland. 

Zajdel planned a continuation of the novel, however he abandoned the idea. Its sketch and three chapters were found in Zajdel's archives after his death. In 2011 the heirs of the author and the SuperNOWA publisher  announced an open competition to complete the novel under the tile  (A Second Look at the Planet Xi). In 2012 the winner was announced, Marcin Kowalczyk from  Bydgoszcz, and his book was published in 2014.

References

1983 novels
Polish science fiction novels
Dystopian novels
1980s science fiction novels
Janusz Zajdel